Rhaebus (Greek: ραιβὸς curved) may refer to:

 Rhaebus (beetle), a genus of insects in the family Chrysomelidae
 Rhaebus, the horse of the mythical king Mezentius